Ritchey is a small lunar impact crater named after the American astronomer George Willis Ritchey. The crater is situated to the east of Albategnius in the central lunar highlands. Its somewhat angular rim is broken along the northwestern wall by a pair of smaller, adjacent craters. The floor of Ritchey is fairly flat, with a pair of small central mounds.

Satellite craters
By convention these features are identified on lunar maps by placing the letter on the side of the satellite midpoint that is closest to Ritchey.

References

External links

Albategnius at The Moon Wiki
Tres Amicis - on the three small craterlets due north of Ritchey F
 

Impact craters on the Moon